Cesare da Conegliano  (mid-16th century) was an Italian painter, known from a single work in Santi Apostoli, Venice.

Biography
He was a contemporary of Titian. It is unclear how this painter was related to either Pordenone or his contemporary fellow townsman Francesco Beccaruzzi, who was a pupil of Pordenone. The relationship to this painter to Cima Da Conegliano, or his son Carlo, or the painter Ciro Da Conegliano is unclear.

References

Year of birth missing
Year of death missing
16th-century Italian painters
Italian male painters
Painters from Venice